Zheng Peng (born 21 October 1992) is a Chinese para cross-country skier who represented China at the 2018 and 2022 Winter Paralympics.

Career
Zheng Peng represented China at the 2018 Winter Paralympics and finished in fourth place in the 15 kilometre sitting event. He again represented China at the 2022 Winter Paralympics and won the gold medals in the 18 kilometre long-distance event and 1.5 kilometre sprint event, and silver medals in the 10 kilometre and 4 × 2.5 kilometre mixed relay.

References 

Living people
Cross-country skiers at the 2018 Winter Paralympics
Cross-country skiers at the 2022 Winter Paralympics
Medalists at the 2022 Winter Paralympics
Paralympic gold medalists for China
Paralympic silver medalists for China
Paralympic medalists in cross-country skiing
1992 births